Luv 4 Rent is the third studio album by American rapper Smino. It was released on October 28, 2022 with Zero Fatigue under license to Motown. The album includes guest appearances from J. Cole, Doechii, Fatman Scoop, Cruza, Lucky Daye, Phoelix, Cory Henry, Ravyn Lenae, Lil Uzi Vert and Reggie.

Background 
On November 16, Smino announced he signed a new record deal with Motown in partnership with his independent label Zero Fatigue. In an article with Billboard, he spoke about the inspiration of the album saying "album No. 3 on the way, it's all about love and how you can use/lose your heart in the process."

Recording and production 
The album contains production from Monte Booker, Phoelix, Groove, Kal Banx, Childish Major, and Cory Henry, among others. His first two studio albums were primarily handled by Booker and didn't contain samples, however this album makes use of samples including "Knock Knock" by Monica on "No L's". The song "90 Proof" was originally planned to be on J. Cole's album The Fall Off, but Smino later asked for the song back. He explained, "I thought about it and the whole time I knew it would be great for me, being on J. Cole’s album. When I was wrapping up the tracklist, though, I just felt like something was missing, and I put "90 Proof" right after my intro and it just sounded like they were meant for each other. So I just called Cole and asked him if I could get the song back and he let me." The first version of the song "Pro Freak" used the sample from J. Cole's "January 28th", but the owners didn't clear the sample. Later, DJ Dahi and Childish Major remade the final beat.

Childish Major also produced "Pudgy". Smino explained how Lil Uzi Vert got on the song saying they were in the studio with Saba and No I.D., and went outside to smoke. Lil Uzi Vert was in the next room and had just posted their song "I Deserve," so he and Smino already had a relationship. "I told him I had this song where I say his name in the hook, and he really wanted to hear it. I start playing it, and he starts turning up to it. I left the studio because I had a dinner to go to and I gave him the file. The restaurant was about 30 minutes away, and as I’m getting out of the car after leaving the studio and getting to dinner, Uzi calls me and plays his verse for me. I didn’t even make it to my meal before he sent me that verse." The album's outro "Lee & Lovie" was produced by Groove when he was in L.A. and saw a video playing that sample on a Sunday morning, which inspired him to inspired him to make the beat and sent it to Smino.

Smino revealed in an interview that he was working on two versions of this album between 2020 and 2021. "I started working on pt. 1 of Luv 4 Rent the day I got off the bus from the Hoopti tour. That day, I made a song called "Luv 4 Rent" that’s still coming out, but that was on pt. 1. But on this version that’s coming out right now, we started working on this probably in 2021." He continued to say, "Pt. 1 is like a B-side, but I didn’t like it as much because it’s more like a movie. It’s mad cinematic, so instead of the deluxe, I’m going to drop pt. 1 like the prequel. It’s going to explain what happened that led me up to this."

Artwork and title 
The album's artwork contains Smino and his friends outside doing their hair in front of a mirror. He explained the inspiration of this cover saying "There were a few things that inspired this cover art. First, I always get my hair done on my [album] covers. I wanted to show that I’m doing my own [hair] on this cover because it’s supposed to represent self-care and self-love. I always had someone else taking care of my shit, or may have been putting my crown in the hands of other motherfuckers. But I can take care of my own crown too." He also explained the theme of this album saying, "Self-love is definitely a big theme on this album, and I also think another way to interpret it is I was leading other people to self-love, too. One big thing I like about my fans is they always tell me that I make them want to be themselves. That’s the best type of inspiration I think I can leave. I want to make niggas want to look inward instead of outward to other shit."

Singles and promotion 
In 2020, Smino announced his third studio album was planned to be released after the mixtape She Already Decided, however was faced multiple delays. He released a number of singles that ended up not making the album in 2021 including the song "MLK Dr", which teased the album title in the music video. On May 18, he released the single "Rice & Gravy" with Monte Booker. On November 11, Smino released the single "I Deserve" featuring NOS. On December 7, 2021, he announced the title of his third studio album, Luv 4 Rent, while performing "I Deserve" and an unreleased song called "Black Luv Ain't Dead" on the YouTube Original series What Say What?!.

On September 30, 2022, he released the first official single from the album, "90 Proof" with J. Cole. On October 10, he announced the album's release date in a trailer narrated by Bootsy Collins. On October 21, he released the second single, "Matinee", while also revealing the album's tracklist.

Tours
On October 11, Smino announced that he will be co-headling a tour with JID in support of the album. The "Luv Is 4ever" Tour includes 39 dates and is scheduled to take place between January to March 2023.

Track listing

Charts

References 

2022 albums
Smino albums
Motown albums